Nicolás Bazzana (born 23 February 1996) is an Argentine professional footballer who plays as a centre-back for Ecuadorian Serie A side Delfín.

Career
Bazzana initially started in the youth system of ADAFI, prior to joining Estudiantes' ranks. After fourteen years in their system, he made his professional debut for the club on 25 May 2017 during a Copa Libertadores match against Botafogo; having previously been an unused substitute four times in all competitions in 2017. His Argentine Primera División debut arrived on 23 February 2018 versus Huracán. Bazzana scored the first goal of his career in Estudiantes' 2017–18 league finale with Rosario Central on 14 May.

On 25 January 2022, Bazzana moved to Ecuadorian Serie A side Delfín SC.

Career statistics
.

References

External links

1996 births
Living people
Footballers from La Plata
Argentine people of Italian descent
Argentine footballers
Argentine expatriate footballers
Association football defenders
Estudiantes de La Plata footballers
Aldosivi footballers
Club Atlético Sarmiento footballers
Delfín S.C. footballers
Argentine Primera División players
Ecuadorian Serie A players
Argentine expatriate sportspeople in Ecuador
Expatriate footballers in Ecuador